Tender Scoundrel  is a 1966 French-Italian comedy film starring Jean Paul Belmondo and directed by Jean Becker.

It recorded admissions in France of 1,970,023.

Plot

Cast 
 Jean-Paul Belmondo as Antoine Maréchal,  Tony  
 Jean-Pierre Marielle as Bob  
 Philippe Noiret as Gabriel Dumonceaux 
 Geneviève Page as Béatrice Dumonceaux 
 Mylène Demongeot as Muriel 
 Paul Mercey as M. Ponce 
 Maria Pacôme as Germaine, a.k.a. Mémère  
 Nadja Tiller as Minna von Strasshofer  
 Robert Morley as Lord Edouard Swift  
 Stefania Sandrelli as Véronique  
 Marcel Dalio as Véronique's father
 Ellen Bahl as Josette   
 Micheline Dax as Marjorie 
 Michèle Girardon as Ritz's daughter 
 Paula Dehelly as Mlle Aline  
 Peter Carsten as Otto Hanz  
 Ivan Desny as Vendor in Cannes  
 Oja Kodar

References

External links

Tender Scoundrel at Le Film Guide

1966 films
French comedy films
1966 comedy films
Films with screenplays by Michel Audiard
Films with screenplays by Albert Simonin
Films directed by Jean Becker
Films scored by Michel Legrand
1960s French films